Cochon's skink (Mabuya cochonae) is a species of skink found in Guadeloupe. It is considered to be possibly extinct.

References

Mabuya
Reptiles described in 2012
Endemic fauna of Guadeloupe
Reptiles of Guadeloupe
Taxa named by Stephen Blair Hedges
Taxa named by Caitlin E. Conn